The Kurdish Academy of Language (KAL) is an Open Global Kurdish Linguistic Network dedicated to Kurdish language research.  From its birth in late 1992, KAL has raised issues relating to all aspects of the Kurdish language, in particular the Kurdish Writing systems. The academy's main goal is to enrich and unify Kurdish.

References

External links  
 Kurdish Academy of Language
Language regulators
Kurdish language
Kurdish culture
Kurdish scholars
Languages of Iraq